The Atari Pascal Language System (usually shortened to Atari Pascal) is a version of the Pascal programming language released by Atari, Inc. for the Atari 8-bit family of home computers in March 1982. Atari Pascal was published through the Atari Program Exchange as unsupported software instead of in Atari's official product line. It requires two disk drives, which greatly limited its potential audience. It includes a 161-page manual.

Development
Atari Pascal was developed by MT Microsystems, which was owned by Digital Research. It's similar to MT/PASCAL+ from the same company. The compiler produces code for a virtual machine, as with UCSD Pascal, instead of generating machine code, but the resulting programs are as much as seven times faster than Apple Pascal. MT Microsystems wrote Atari Pascal with a planned "super Atari" 8-bit model in mind, one with 128K of RAM and a dual-floppy drive. This machine never materialized, but the software was released because of pressure within Atari, though only through the Atari Program Exchange.

References

1982 software
Atari 8-bit family software
Pascal (programming language) compilers
Atari Program Exchange software